Josué Isaac Martinez Areas (born 25 March 1990) is a Costa Rican footballer who currently plays for Guadalupe.

Club career
Martinez began his career with top Costa Rican side Deportivo Saprissa. His first appearance with the club was in the 2009 Torneo de Invierno, this coming after a successful role in the 2009 FIFA U-20 World Cup. Martinez won one title with the club during the 2009–10 Costa Rican Primera División season the Campeonato de Verano 2010. Josué was an important part of The Purple Monster, being one of its top goalscorers in that tournament also scoring the 1-0 winning goal against Liga Deportiva Alajuelense in the first of two matches of "El Clásico" de Costa Rica, at Ricardo Saprissa Stadium in San José. He wore the number 28 for Saprissa and scored 19 goals in 66 league matches with the club. Martinez also scored an important goal during the CONCACAF Champions League which sent Saprissa to the 2010-11 knockout stage. On 19 October 2010 in a match that was played in Seattle, Martinez's scored an 89th-minute goal beating Seattle Sounders goalkeeper, Kasey Keller which helped Saprissa to a 2–1 victory.

On 7 December 2011, Philadelphia Union signed the Costa Rican international. In his first season in Major League Soccer Martinez appeared in 18 league matches and scored 1 goal. On 6 December 2012, Martinez was traded to New York Red Bulls along with allocation money for Sebastien Le Toux.

Martínez was waived by New York on 29 March 2013.

International career
Martinez was a prominent member of Costa Rica's 2009 FIFA U-20 World Cup squad, where Costa Rica placed 4th after losing to Hungary in the 3rd place match. He scored two goals in the competition.

Martinez is considered a promising prospect for Costa Rican football and its National Team, he debuted with the full national team in 2009 prior to his debut with the Saprissa first team. He was a member of Costa Rica's 2011 Copa América side, netting 1 goal in 3 matches during the competition.

Scores and results list. Costa Rica's goal tally first.

Career statistics

Club

Updated 29 March 2013.

International

Statistics accurate as of 7 December 2011

References

External links

1990 births
Living people
Footballers from San José, Costa Rica
Association football forwards
Costa Rican footballers
Costa Rican expatriate footballers
Costa Rica international footballers
2011 Copa Centroamericana players
2011 CONCACAF Gold Cup players
2011 Copa América players
Deportivo Saprissa players
Philadelphia Union players
New York Red Bulls players
Santos de Guápiles footballers
C.F. Universidad de Costa Rica footballers
C.S. Herediano footballers
Municipal Pérez Zeledón footballers
Guadalupe F.C. players
Municipal Grecia players
Liga FPD players
Antigua GFC players
Major League Soccer players
Liga Nacional de Fútbol de Guatemala players
2009 CONCACAF U-20 Championship players
Costa Rican expatriate sportspeople in the United States
Costa Rican expatriate sportspeople in Guatemala
Expatriate soccer players in the United States
Expatriate footballers in Guatemala